is a Japanese judoka who won a bronze medal at the 2012 Summer Olympics. He is competing for the Nippon Steel Corporation Judo Club.

Biography
Nishiyama was born in Shimonoseki, Yamaguchi Prefecture and graduated from the Kokushikan University in Tokyo. In the early 2000s he was competing in the 100 kg category but then moved to the 90 kg division.

Competitions
Nishiyama was defeated in the selection competitions for the 2012 London Olympics, but nevertheless was selected for the national team. In London, he was defeated in the quarter-finals, and won the bronze medal via repechage, against Kirill Denisov, by judges decision.

References

External links
 
 
 
 

1985 births
Living people
Japanese male judoka
Judoka at the 2012 Summer Olympics
Olympic judoka of Japan
Olympic medalists in judo
Olympic bronze medalists for Japan
Medalists at the 2012 Summer Olympics
People from Shimonoseki
Universiade medalists in judo
Universiade bronze medalists for Japan
Medalists at the 2009 Summer Universiade
20th-century Japanese people
21st-century Japanese people